Pittwater is an electoral district of the Legislative Assembly in the Australian state of New South Wales. Located in Sydney's north-east, it is 175.32 km2 in size, and comprises a part of the local government area of Northern Beaches Council—mostly the portion that was formerly Pittwater Council.

It is named after Pittwater, a body of water the district roughly surrounds.

It includes the suburbs or localities of Avalon, Bayview, Bilgola, Church Point, Cottage Point, Duffys Forest, Elanora Heights, Ingleside, Ku-ring-gai Chase, Mona Vale, Narrabeen, Newport, North Narrabeen, Palm Beach, Scotland Island, Terrey Hills, and Warriewood.

The current Member of Parliament for Pittwater is Rob Stokes of the Liberal Party. He was first elected at the 2007 state election, defeating Independent Alex McTaggart.

History
The electoral district of Pittwater was created in 1973. Located in the traditional  stronghold of Sydney's Northern Beaches, for most of its existence it has been a comfortably safe Liberal seat. Its first member was Sir Robert William Askin, then Premier of New South Wales. It had been created out of a large chunk of Askin's old seat of Collaroy, and was thus a natural place for Askin to transfer when the seat was abolished.

The seat was held by New South Wales Opposition Leader John Brogden until his dramatic resignation in 2005. The Liberal stranglehold on the seat was lost in the resulting by-election when the Mayor of Pittwater Council, Alex McTaggart, standing as an Independent candidate, defeated the Liberal Paul Nicolau in a landslide.

The seat reverted to form at the 2007 general election, with new Liberal candidate Rob Stokes comfortably regaining the seat for his party with 61% of the two-party vote to McTaggart's 39%. Stokes actually won just over 50% of the primary vote, just a few thousand votes over the threshold to win the seat without the need for preferences. Stokes won every booth in the district with the exception of Scotland Island, whose few hundred offshore voters traditionally buck the trend. Stokes has held the seat without serious difficulty since then, and now sits on a majority of 20.8 percent, the third-safest in the state for a Coalition-held metropolitan seat.

While  usually runs dead in northern Sydney, Pittwatter is especially unfriendly territory for Labor even by northern Sydney standards. Labor has only come reasonably close to winning the seat once, when it scored a 14-point swing in the "Wranslide" election of 1978. However, Labor has not won more than 20 percent of the primary vote since 1984, and not placed better than third place since 2007.

The seat is almost entirely within the equally conservative federal seat of Mackellar.

Members for Pittwater

Election results

References

External links

Pittwater
1973 establishments in Australia
Constituencies established in 1973
Northern Beaches